William Huggins was an English astronomer.

William Huggins may also refer to:

William Huggins (animal artist) (1820–1884), English painter
William John Huggins (1781–1845), English marine painter